Depok City Football Club (simply known as DCFC or Depok City) is an Indonesian football club based in Depok, West Java. They currently compete in the Liga 3.

History
Depok City FC is officially present in national football by becoming a member of the local Association City of PSSI on 18 November 2020. The acquisition agreement was made by the owners of Persebam Babakan Madang, Delif Subekti and Supari as CEO of PT. Adhidaya Gunung Merapi (AGM). The administrators also witnessed this activity live.

References

External links

Depok
Sport in West Java
Football clubs in Indonesia
Football clubs in West Java
Association football clubs established in 2020
2020 establishments in Indonesia